Nancy Alonso (Havana, 1949 – 3 April 2018) was a Cuban biologist, university professor, and writer.
She is an Alba de Céspedes Female Narrative Prize laureate, and received honorable mention in the David Short Story Prize. Among her notable books are Tirar la primera piedra (1997), Cerrado por reparación (2002) and Desencuentro (2009).

Selected works 
 1997, Tirar la primera piedra. 
 2002, Cerrado por reparación. 
 2009, Desencuentro.
 2015, Damas de Social.

Awards 
 1995: Mención Premio David.
 2002: Premio de Narrativa Femenina Alba de Céspedes
 2015: Premio Anual de la Crítica Literaria, La Habana, Cuba.

Works in anthologies 

 Estatuas de sal. Ediciones Unión. 1996.
 Rumba senza palme né caresse. Besa, Nardó. 1996. 
 Cubana. Beacon Press, Boston. 1998. 
 Habaneras. Txalaparta, País Vasco. 2000. 
 Cuentistas cubanas contemporáneas. Editorial Biblioteca de Textos Universitarios. Salta. Argentina. 2000
 Making a Scene. Mango, Londres. 2002.
 Caminos de Eva, Voces desde la Isla. Editorial Plaza Mayor. Puerto Rico. 2002. 
 Cuentistas cubanas de hoy. Océano. México. 2002. 
 Las musas inquietantes. Lecturum. México, y Ediciones Unión. 2003. 
 Open your Eyes and Soar. White Pine Press, Búfalo, New York. 2003). 
 Mi sagrada familia. Editorial Oriente, Santiago de Cuba. 2004). 
 Cuentos infieles. Editorial Letras Cubanas. 2006. 
 Nosotras dos. Ediciones Unión. 2008.
 Cuba on the Edge. Cultural and Communications Press. UK. 2008. 
 Cuentos con aroma a tabaco. Editorial Popular. España. 2008.

References

Bibliography 

"Ganó Nancy Alonso el Alba de Céspedes". La Ventana.
"Introducing Cuban author Nancy Alonso". PAMLA. 2016.
Hernández Hormilla, Helen. Palabras sin velo. Caminos. p. 297. .
Alfonso, Vitalina (enero-febrero 2004). "Delirios cotidianos". La Gaceta de Cuba.
González López Waldo. El cierre de Nancy Alonso.
Campuzano, Luisa. Las muchachas de la Habana no tienen temor de Dios. Ediciones Unión. .
Yáñez Quiñoa, Mirta (2000). Cubanas a capítulo. Editorial Oriente.
Espinosa Domínguez Carlos. Franz Kafka en Luyanó.
Literatura de mujeres y cambio social: narradoras cubanas de hoy. (32). 2003.
Yáñez Quiñoa, Mirta. Cubanas a capítulo. Segunda temporada. Editorial Letras Cubanas. p. 164. .
de Diego, Josefina (3 de marzo de 2015). "Damas y damiselas en la Feria del Libro". Cubanobooks.
López del Amo, Rolando (9 al 15 de ener de 2016). "Las Damas de Social". La Jiribilla. Año XII (757).
Diario de Cuba. "Conceden el Premio Anual de la Crítica Literaria a una decena de obras".

Cuban biologists
Cuban women writers
Cuban short story writers
People from Havana
1949 births
2018 deaths